The Riyadh Park is a shopping mall in Riyadh, Saudi Arabia.

History
The movie theater of the shopping mall was opened on 30 April 2018.

Architecture
The shopping mall covers a total floor area of 132,000 m2 with gross leasable area of 92,000 m2. Its parking lot can accommodate 2,000 cars.

Tenants
The shopping mall features the Museum of Illusions.

References

External links
 

Year of establishment missing
Shopping malls in Saudi Arabia
Buildings and structures in Riyadh
Economy of Riyadh